Benjamin Olinde Rodrigues (6 October 1795 – 17 December 1851), more commonly known as Olinde Rodrigues, was a French banker, mathematician, and social reformer. In mathematics Rodrigues is remembered for Rodrigues' rotation formula for vectors, the Rodrigues formula about series of orthogonal polynomials and the Euler–Rodrigues parameters.

Biography
Rodrigues was born into a well-to-do Sephardi Jewish family in Bordeaux. He was awarded a doctorate in mathematics on 28 June 1815 by the University of Paris. His dissertation contains the result now called Rodrigues' formula.

After graduation, Rodrigues became a banker. A close associate of the Comte de Saint-Simon, Rodrigues continued, after Saint-Simon's death in 1825, to champion the older man's socialist ideals, a school of thought that came to be known as Saint-Simonianism. During this period, Rodrigues published writings on politics, social reform, and banking.

In 1840 he published a result on transformation groups, which applied Leonhard Euler's four squares formula, a precursor to the quaternions of William Rowan Hamilton, to the problem of representing rotations in space. 
In 1846 Arthur Cayley acknowledged Euler's and Rodrigues' priority describing orthogonal transformations.

Rodrigues is credited as originating the idea of the artist as an avant-garde.

Publications 
 Mouvement de rotation d'un corps de révolution pesant, Paris, 1815
 "Mémoire sur l'attraction des sphéroïdes", Correspondence Sur l'École Impériale Polytechnique, vol. 3, pp. 361–385, 1815
 Théorie de la caisse hypothécaire, ou Examen du sort des emprunteurs, des porteurs d'obligations et des actionnaires de cet établissement, 1820
 Appel : religion saint-simonienne, 1831
 L'artiste, le savant et l'industriel: Dialogue, 1825
 Réunion générale de la famille : séances des 19 et 21 novembre, 1831
 Son premier écrit / Saint-Simon, 1832
 Le disciple de Saint-Simon aux Saint-Simoniens et au public, 1832
 Aux saint-simoniens, 13 février 1832 : bases de la loi morale proposées à l'acceptation des femmes, 1832
 Olinde Rodrigues à M. Michel Chevalier, rédacteur du "Globe" : religion saint-simonienne, 1832
 "Sur le nombre de manière de décomposer un Polygone en triangles au moyen de diagonales", Journal de Mathématiques Pures et Appliquées, vol. 3, pp. 547–548, 1838 
 "Sur le nombre de manière de d’effectuer un produit de n facteurs", Journal de Mathématiques Pures et Appliquées, vol. 3, p. 549, 1838
 "Démonstration élémentaire et purement algébrique du développement d’un binome élevé à une puissance négative ou fractionnaire", Journal de Mathématiques Pures et Appliquées, vol. 3, pp. 550–551, 1838
 "Note sur les inversions, ou dérangements produits dans les permutations", Journal de Mathématiques Pures et Appliquées, vol. 4, pp. 236–240, 1839
 De l'organisation des banques à propos du projet de loi sur la Banque de France, 1840
 "Des lois géométriques qui régissent les déplacements d'un système solide dans l'espace: et de la variation des coordonnées provenant de ces déplacements considérés indépendamment des causes qui peuvent les produire", Journal de Mathématiques Pures et Appliquées, vol. 5, pp. 380-440, 1840
 Les Peuples et les diplomates. La Paix ou la guerre, 1840
 Œuvres de Saint-Simon, 1841
 Poésies sociales des ouvriers, réunies et publiées par Olinde Rodrigues, 1841
 "Du devéloppement des fonctions trigonométriques en produits de facteurs binomes", Journal de Mathématiques Pures et Appliquées, vol. 8, pp. 217–224, 1843
 "Note sur lévaluation des arcs de cercle, en fonction linéaire des sinus ou des tangentes de fractions de ces arcs, décroissant en progression géométrique", Journal de Mathématiques Pures et Appliquées, vol. 8, pp. 225–234, 1843
 Théorie des banques, 1848
 De l'Organisation du suffrage universel, proposition d'un nouveau mode électoral par Olinde Rodrigues, 1848
 Organisation du travail, association du travail et du capital, 1848
 Organisation du travail, bases de l'organisation des banques, 1848

See also 
Euler–Rodrigues formula
 Spherical harmonics

References

External links 
 Olinde Rodrigues sur Le Maitron
 Olinde Rodrigues sur Jewish Encyclopedia
 Olinde Rodrigues

Bibliography 
 
 Louis Gabriel Michaud (1863) Biographie universelle ancienne et moderne
 
 
 Jeremy J. Gray (1980) Olinde Rodrigues' paper of 1840 on Transformation Groups, Archive for History of Exact Sciences 21(4): 375–385, .

1795 births
1851 deaths
Businesspeople from Bordeaux
Lycée Louis-le-Grand alumni
French bankers
19th-century French Sephardi Jews
Scientists from Bordeaux
Historical treatment of quaternions
19th-century French mathematicians
Saint-Simonists
Burials at Père Lachaise Cemetery
British social reformers
Jewish socialists
French people of Portuguese descent